Vodafone Direto is a low-cost Mobile Virtual Network Operator, launched in 2005 in Portugal, over the network Vodafone.

External links
 

Vodafone
Telecommunications companies established in 2005
Mobile virtual network operators
2005 establishments in Portugal